Cha Soo-yong (born 30 August 1980) is a South Korean para table tennis player. He won a silver medal at the 2016 Summer Paralympics. He is coached by Choi Kyoung-sik.

His disability is congenital.

References 

1980 births
Living people
Table tennis players at the 2016 Summer Paralympics
Medalists at the 2016 Summer Paralympics
South Korean male table tennis players
Paralympic silver medalists for South Korea
Paralympic table tennis players of South Korea
Sportspeople from Daegu
Paralympic medalists in table tennis
Table tennis players at the 2020 Summer Paralympics